Fort Dodge Community School District (FDCSD) is a public school district headquartered in Fort Dodge, Iowa.

The district is entirely in Webster County. In addition to Fort Dodge, Badger and Otho are in the district boundaries. It also serves the Coalville census-designated place.

History

Jesse Ulrich became superintendent in 2018 when all members of the FDCSD school board voted to hire him.

In 2018 the district's elementary school boundaries were modified. That year it also placed an enrollment cap in its elementary schools. Butler and Duncombe elementaries however would have eight extra spaces for new students who move into their attendance zones, while Cooper and Feelhaver each have four.

Schools
 Secondary
Fort Dodge Senior High School
Fort Dodge Middle School
 Elementary
 Butler Elementary School
 Cooper Elementary School
 Duncombe Elementary School
 In 2018, the school had about 350 students. The current  facility, with a capacity of 450, began construction in 2016 and opened in 2018; the Fair Oaks Middle School building housed Duncombe students during construction.
 Feelhaver Elementary School
 Preschool
 Riverside Early Learning Center

See also
List of school districts in Iowa

References

External links
 Fort Dodge Community School District
 
School districts in Iowa
Education in Webster County, Iowa
Fort Dodge, Iowa